Crash Ryan is a four-issue comic book mini-series created by Ron Harris and published by Marvel Comics' Epic Comics line in 1984.

Publication history
Harris brought back the characters in a four-part story that ran in Dark Horse Presents #44-46 (September 1990 - November 1990).

Plot
The story takes place in the mid-1930s, and details the fight between the United Airmen and their merciless foe "The Doom". The Doom and his men attack Pearl Harbor and invade and takeover Japan until being defeated by the United Airmen, leaving a power vacuum in the Pacific.

In the story in DHP, set 2 month's later, Crash and his friend encounter air pirates using left over Doomsmen planes, while the Soviet Union takes advantage by taking over Japan.

In other media
In 2015, a film adaptation was in development, with Ryan Heppe producing, but seems to have ceased after no further announcements.

References

External links
 Crash Ryan
 
 

1984 comics debuts
Comics characters introduced in 1984
Aviation comics
Fictional aviators
Comics set in the 1930s
Dark Horse Comics titles
American comics adapted into films